,  nicknamed , was a Japanese record producer, songwriter and singer. He sometimes used the spelling of "Kazuhiko Katoh".

History
As a member of the Folk Crusaders, Katō launched his recording career in the mid-1960s. "Kaettekita Yopparai (I Only Live Twice)", their psychedelic debut song composed by Katō and released in 1967, sold more than 1.3 million copies in Japan, and became one of the best-selling singles of the early Japanese popular music industry. The group also starred in director Nagisa Oshima's 1968 film Kaette kita yopparai (alternately known as Sinner in Paradise or Three Resurrected Drunkards).

After the breakup of Folk Crusaders in 1970, Katō gained success for his production works for other musicians, including Shigeru Izumiya, Mariya Takeuchi, and Takuro Yoshida. In particular, Sadistic Mika Band, the acclaimed project he started with his first wife Mika Fukui, received international success. Their 1974 album entitled Kurofune (The Black Ship) is regarded as one of the most significant Japanese rock albums of the mid-1970s. The group was disbanded and reassembled again several times, with new vocalists such as Yumi Matsutoya, Karen Kirishima, and Kaela Kimura.

As a composer, Katō wrote the theme song "Ai Oboete Imasu ka" for the anime film Macross: Do You Remember Love?, which was released during the summer of 1984 in Japan. He later formed a songwriting team with his second wife, the late Kazumi Yasui. Most of the songs they wrote were recorded and produced by Kenji Sawada. In 1990, Katō teamed up with graphic artists, Haruhiko Shono and Kuniyoshi Kaneko, to provide the music for the award-winning Japanese computer game, Alice.

In March 2008, Katō formed the rock band Vitamin-Q with Masami Tsuchiya, Gota Yashiki, Rei Ohara and Anza.

Death
Katō committed suicide by hanging on October 17, 2009 at a hotel in Karuizawa, Kitasaku District, Nagano Prefecture, Japan. Police discovered a suicide note in his hotel room.

Albums
Titles in brackets are for rough translation purposes only.

ぼくのそばにおいでよ (Come Near Me) (1969)
スーパー・ガス (Super Gas) (1971)
それから先のことは (Then What Lies Ahead) (1976)
ガーディニア (Gadinia) (1978)
パパ・ヘミングウェイ (Hemingway Papa) (1979)
うたかたのオペラ (1980) (Better known as "L'opéra fragile")
ベル・エキセントリック (Belle Excentrique) (1981)
あの頃、マリー・ローランサン (Around Her, Marie Laurencin) (1983)
ヴェネチア (Venice) (1984)
マルタの鷹 (The Maltese Falcon) (1987)
ボレロ・カリフォルニア (California Bolero) (1991)

References

External links
 

1947 births
2009 suicides
20th-century Japanese composers
Japanese folk singers
Japanese male composers
Japanese male singer-songwriters
Japanese record producers
Musicians from Kyoto
Suicides by hanging in Japan
20th-century Japanese male singers
20th-century Japanese singers
Sadistic Mika Band members
The Folk Crusaders members